(born October 27, 1973 in Iwate) is a retired female freestyle swimmer from Japan, who represented her native country at the 1992 Summer Olympics. Her best result in two starts in Barcelona, Spain was the 10th place (3:49.91) in the Women's 4×100 metres Freestyle Relay event, alongside Ayako Nakano, Yoko Koikawa and Suzu Chiba.

References
 sports-reference

1973 births
Living people
Olympic swimmers of Japan
Swimmers at the 1992 Summer Olympics
Japanese female freestyle swimmers
20th-century Japanese women